WUSF may refer to:

 WUSF (FM), a radio station (89.7 FM) licensed to Tampa, Florida, United States
 WEDQ, a television station (channel 16 analog/34 digital) licensed to Tampa, Florida, United States, which held the call sign WUSF-TV from 1966 to 2017